Coding efficiency may refer to:

In computing 
 Data compression efficiency
 Algorithmic efficiency

In biology 
 Efficient coding hypothesis

See also
 Efficiency (disambiguation)
 Coding (disambiguation)